Main Source is the third studio album by hip hop artist Large Professor. It was released on September 15, 2008, through Gold Dust Media.

Track listing 
All tracks produced by Large Professor, except track 7 produced by Marco Polo
 "The Entrance" – 2:15
 "Hot: Sizzlin', Scorchin', Torchin', Blazin'" – 2:57	
 "'Maica Livin'" (feat. Killah Sha, Guardian Leep) – 3:48	
 "Pump Ya Fist Like This" (feat. Mikey D, Lotto) – 3:13	
 "Party Time" –	2:45
 "In The Ghetto" – 2:49	
 "Hardcore Hip Hop" – 3:19	
 "Frantic Barz" – 3:02	
 "Sewin' Love" – 2:58
 "RuDopeDapnNoyd Pt. 1" (feat. Jeru the Damaja) –	1:01
 "RuDopeDapnNoyd Pt. 2" (feat. Lil' Dap) – 0:41	
 "RuDopeDapnNoyd Pt. 3" (feat. Big Noyd) – 0:48	
 "Classic Emergency" – 2:32	
 "Rockin' Hip Hop" – 3:23	
 "Large Pro Says" – 2:03
 "To The Meadows" – 1:46	
 "The Hardest" (feat. AZ, Styles P) – 4:43

References 

2008 albums
Albums produced by Large Professor
Large Professor albums